Morisaki (written: 森崎 lit. "forest peninsula") is a Japanese surname. Notable people with the surname include:

, Japanese film director and screenwriter
, Japanese footballer
, Japanese footballer
, Japanese footballer
, Japanese footballer
, Japanese chef and television personality

Japanese-language surnames